Hampton Hendrix Office is a historic home office building located at Batesburg-Leesville, Lexington County, South Carolina. It was built about 1897, and is a one-story, decorated Victorian rectangular weatherboard building.  It measures approximately 3 metres by 5.49 metres (or 10 by 18 feet), and has a gabled metal roof and highly decorative façade.  The building is set on a lattice brick curtain wall.

It was listed on the National Register of Historic Places in 1982.

References

Office buildings on the National Register of Historic Places in South Carolina
Victorian architecture in South Carolina
Commercial buildings completed in 1897
Buildings and structures in Lexington County, South Carolina
National Register of Historic Places in Lexington County, South Carolina